Radio Pink is a Serbian radio station established by Željko Mitrović, the president of the Pink International Company. It was created on December 19, 1993 as one of the first commercial radio stations in Yugoslavia, and broadcast music 24 hours a day.

References

External links
Official website

Radio stations in Serbia
Radio stations established in 1993
Mass media in Belgrade
1993 establishments in Serbia